Perron  may refer to:

People
 Count Perron, Sardinian ambassador and secretary of state
 Ernest Perron (1908–1961), a Swiss man who became politically powerful in Iran
 Pierre Cuillier-Perron (1753–1834), a French military adventurer in India
 Fleuri Perron (1866–1931), an Alberta politician and businessman
 Oskar Perron (1880–1975), a German mathematician
 Jean Perron (born 1946), a head coach in the National Hockey League
 Gilles Perron (born 1940), a Canadian politician
 Marshall Perron (born 1942), a former Chief Minister of the Northern Territory of Australia
 David Perron (born 1988), a Canadian ice hockey player
 François Perron, a French born ballet dancer who now works and resides in the United States

Other
 Perron (columnar monument), a column built in cities belonging to the Prince-Bishopric of Liège (980–1795)
 Perron (staircase), an external staircase usually leading to the main entrance of a building

See also
 Duperron, a French surname
 Peron (disambiguation)